Hruška (feminine Hrušková) is a Czech and Slovak occupational surname, which means a grower or seller of pears, from hruška ("pear"). The name may refer to: 

Aleš Hruška (born 1985), Czech footballer
David Hruška (born 1977), Czech ice hockey player
Franz Hruska (1888–1977), German politician
Jan Hruška (born 1975), Czech cyclist
Karel Hruška (1891–1966), Czech actor and singer
Květa Hrušková, Czech table tennis player
Laura Chapman Hruska (1935–2010), American writer and publisher
Luboš Hruška (born 1987), Czech footballer
Martin Hruška (born 1981), Czech footballer
Matúš Hruška (born 1994), Slovak footballer
Milan Hruška (born 1985), Slovak ice hockey player
Nina Hrušková-Bělská, Czech chess player
Petr Hruška (poet) (born 1964), Czech writer
Rachelle Hruska (born 1983), American businesswoman
Radim Hruška (born 1984), Czech ice hockey player
Roman Hruska (1904–1999), American politician
Rudolf Hruska (1915–1995), Austrian automobile designer
Sharon Brown-Hruska (born 1959), American finance analyst
Vladimír Hruška (born 1957), Czech football player and manager
Zdeněk Hruška (born 1954), Czech footballer

See also
Gruszka (Polish form)
Hruşca (Romanian form)

References

Czech-language surnames